The 2019–20 Úrvalsdeild karla was the 69th season of the Úrvalsdeild karla, the top tier men's basketball league in Iceland. The season started on 3 October 2019. On 13 March 2020, with each team having one game left, the season was postponed for at least four weeks due to the coronavirus pandemic in the country. 
On 18 March, the rest of the season was canceled. Fjölnir was relegated and Stjarnan was named divisional champions for having the best record at the time of the cancelation but no national champions would be named for the season.

Competition format
The participating teams first played a conventional round-robin schedule with every team playing each opponent once home and once away for a total of 22 games. The top eight teams qualified for the championship playoffs whilst the two last qualified were relegated to Division 1.

Teams

Managerial changes

Regular season

Standings

Results

Notable occurrences
On May 11, the board of Þór Þorlákshöfn wrote and open letter to the Icelandic Basketball Association, denouncing Tindastóll's act of offering Baldur Þór Ragnarsson their head coaching position while he was still under contract with Þór.
On May 11, it was reported that Jaka Brodnik would follow his former Þór Þorlákshöfn coach north and sign with Tindastóll.
On May 15, it was reported that Keflavík owed the Icelandic Basketball Association 3 million ISK in unpaid transfer and referee fees and would lose their spot in the Úrvalsdeild if the debt would not be paid by May 30.
On 29 May, KR signed the team's all-time leading scorer and former captain Brynjar Þór Björnsson, who had spent the previous season with Tindastóll, and brothers Matthías Orri Sigurðarson and Jakob Sigurðarson.
On June 5, it was reported that Keflavík had signed former Augusta University player Deane Williams.
On June 23, Njarðvík signed Evaldas Žabas.
On June 26, Þór Akureyri signed Colombian national team player Hansel Atencia.
On July 5, Njarðvík signed a 2-year sponsorship deal with Njarðtak, naming their home arena the Njarðtaks-gryfjan (English: The Njarðtak's Den).
On July 7, Tindastóll signed former EuroLeague player Jasmin Perković.
On July 8, Stjarnan signed former Olympian and British national basketball team player Kyle Johnson.
On July 10, it was reported that Icelandic national team player, Collin Pryor, had left Stjarnan after spending the last two seasons with the team.
On July 18, Haukar signed former Úrvalsdeild scoring champion Flenard Whitfield. He previously played with Skallagrímur during the 2016–17 season.
On July 22, Stjarnan signed former Þór Þorlákshöfn star player, Nikolas Tomsick.
On July 26, it was reported that Icelandic national team player Gunnar Ólafsson had terminated his contract with Keflavík. He was a key player for Keflavík the previous season, averaging 14.1 points and 3.9 rebounds per game.
On August 13, Valur signed 7-times national champion and Icelandic national team player Pavel Ermolinskij.
On August 20, it was reported that ÍR had signed Swiss national team member Roberto Kovac. Shortly later, it was revealed that he had also signed with Croatian club KK Cibona without ÍR's approval. In September, Cibona bought up Kovac's contract við ÍR before he played any games for the team.
On August 22, Grindavík signed Nigerian national team player Jamal Olasewere.
On August 24, ÍR signed Icelandic national team member Collin Pryor who had spent the previous seasons with Stjarnan.
On August 26, Haukar signed Dutch-American Gerald Robinson. He spent the previous season with ÍR where he went with the team to the Úrvalsdeild Finals where it lost to KR.
On August 27, KR signed Michael Craion who won two national championships with the team in 2015 and 2016. He spent the 2018–19 with Keflavík and later ADA Blois Basket 41 in the French LNB Pro B, after Keflavík was knocked from the Úrvalsdeild playoffs.
On August 28, Grindavík signed Dagur Kár Jónsson to a 2-year contract. Dagur Kár, who played the 2018–19 season with Flyers Wels in the Österreichische Basketball Bundesliga, had previously played for Grindavík from 2016 2018.
On August 29, Valur signed Icelandic national team member Frank Aron Booker. Booker's father, Frank Booker, played for Valur from 1991 to 1994 and led the team to the Úrvalsdeild Finals in 1992.
On September 9, it was reported that the board of Þór Akureyri was contemplating to withdraw the team from the Úrvalsdeild due to financial difficulties. The day after, Þór announced that they had solved the issue and would play in the league this season.
On September 10, Icelandic national team player Kári Jónsson signed back with his hometown team of Haukar.
On October 21, Njarðvík released Evaldas Žabas after appearing in three games where he averaged 12.0 points and 3.3 assists.
On October 23, Sigurður Þorsteinsson ÍR, signing a two-year contract, after a short stint with BC Orchies which ended prematurely due to the club's financial difficulties.
On 28 October, Icelandic national team player Breki Gylfason returned to the Úrvalsdeild after spending the previous season with the Appalachian State University basketball team and signed with his former team Haukar.
On October 31, Valur point guard, Chris Jones, refused to play the second half of Valur's game against Keflavík, effectively ending his stay with the club. Valur officially terminated its contract with Jones the following day.
On 6 November, Njarðvík signed point guard Chaz Williams.
On 6 November, Daði Berg Grétarsson of ÍR was suspended for three games for pushing Mantas Virbalas of Þór Akureyri to the ground and twice kicking the ball so it hit Virbalas where he lay on the floor. Virbalas was suspended for one game for his retaliation towards Daði Berg.
On 8 November, KR's star player Jón Arnór Stefánsson was injured in the fourth quarter of KR's loss against Tindastóll after colliding with Helgi Rafn Viggósson. After the game, the coach of KR, Ingi Þór Steinþórsson was livid and accused Helgi of deliberately injuring Jón Arnór, which Helgi Rafn denied. Later, the two were spotted having a heated argument before Helgi left the stadium.
On 11 November, former Icelandic national team member Danero Thomas signed with ÍR where he previously had played during the 2017–18 season. He had started the season with Hamar in the 1. deild karla where he averaged 17.2 points and 6.0 rebounds in six games, all wins.
On 21 November, Valur signed P.J. Alawoya, who won the national championship and the Icelandic Cup with KR in 2017.
On 29 November, Stjarnan blew out defending champions KR, 110–67. It was the largest defeat by a reigning national champion since name change of the league in 1978 and KR's largest defeat in the top-tier league.
On 4 December, Stjarnan signed Icelandic national team player Gunnar Ólafsson.
On 12 December, suspicions rose that the results in a game between ÍR and Tindastóll had been fixed after unusual amounts where betted in ÍR's victory despite Tindastóll being heavy favorites to win. After an investigation by the Icelandic Basketball Association, Íslenskar Getraunir, the Global Lottery Monitory System and independent investigators who reviewed the game, it was concluded that no fixing had occurred. It stated that the reason for the high amount of betting was most likely due to the common knowledge that the team's travel to Reykjavík from Sauðárkrókur took several hours due to weather conditions and the game had to be postponed for an hour due to that.
On 31 January, KR announced it had signed point guard Mike DiNunno for the rest of the season. DiNunno had finished the previous season with the team and was a key factor in their national championship run.
On 5 March, Brynjar Þór Björnsson announced he would not play in KR's upcoming game against Stjarnan due to the coronavirus pandemic in the country without consulting the team first.

References

External links
Official Icelandic Basketball Association website

Icelandic
Lea
Úrvalsdeild karla (basketball)